Delenda is the debut album by the progressive metalcore/mathcore band From a Second Story Window. This is the band's first release with vocalist Will Jackson and final release to feature lead guitarist and songwriter Derek Vasconi.

A music video was released for the song "These Lights Above Us".

Track listing

Personnel 
From a Second Story Window
 Will Jackson - vocals
 Derek Vasconi - lead guitar
 Rob Hileman - rhythm guitar
 Joe Sudrovic - bass
 Nick Huffman - drums

Additional personnel
 Jocko – engineering, mixing, mastering
 Eric "The Mook" Bukowski – additional engineering and mastering
 Jason Fiske – artwork and design
Billy Bottom – additional vocals on track 5

References

2006 debut albums
From a Second Story Window albums
Black Market Activities albums
Metal Blade Records albums
Concept albums